Philadelphia Grand Jury (The Philly Jays) are an Australian trio from Sydney. The band's current line-up consists of Joel "MC Bad Genius" Beeson on bass, keyboard and guitar, Simon "Berkfinger" Berckelman on vocals and guitar and Dan "Dan W. Sweat" Williams on drums. They play a mix of indie, punk and soul.

Biography

2001-2009: Hope Is for Hopers
Beeson originally formed a band called Johnson in 2001 with his friend Berckelman, before creating the indie band label Motherlovin' Records in 2004. Subsequent bands included Malcolm X & the Black Auditorium and Berkfinger and The Sweats, the latter combining to form Philadelphia Grand Jury in early 2008.

In May 2009, the band signed a joint venture deal with Boomtown Records.

In June 2009, the band released "Going to the Casino (Tomorrow Night)" where it received significant play on Triple J and featured on the television mini-series Underbelly: A Tale of Two Cities, also appearing on the soundtrack album.

The band's debut album, Hope Is for Hopers, was released on 25 September 2009, reaching No. 34 on the ARIA Albums Chart.

Williams departed from the group in September 2009. Williams' position was temporarily filled by Ivan Lisyak, aka 'Emergency Ivan,' before a permanent replacement – American session musician, Calvin Welch (Earth, Wind and Fire, Sonny Stitt) – joined the band.

At the fourth annual AIR Awards, held on 22 November 2009, Philadelphia Grand Jury won an award for "Best Independent Single or EP" with their single "Going to the Casino".

2010-2011: Break up
In October 2010, the band announced that Welch had left the band, as the 'rigours of the road have proved too arduous for the 55-year-old drummer.' Welch's replacement was Berlin-based/Brisbane-born Sullivan "Susie Dreamboat" Patten (of I Heart Hiroshima), who performed with the band on their tour of the United Kingdom, the United States and Australia. Patten finished touring with the band in January 2011.

In March 2011, news surfaced that the band had abandoned work on the follow up to Hope is for Hopers. When FasterLouder sought a follow-up, they were met with the following statement in regards to the band's current status. "Philadelphia Grand Jury are on something of a hiatus. No need to make it a bigger deal than it is. Creative individuals tend to have more than one project and Philadelphia Grand Jury is just one of Berkfinger's musical personas. Berkfinger is currently focusing on other projects, including moving his recording gear to Berlin to finish the recordings that he has been working on in the various incarnations of studios that he has built over the years." On 2 November 2011 the band posted on their Facebook page that the band had broken up.

2013-present:Summer of Doom
After the split, Beeson moved onto production and remix work under the moniker of Boyhood, while Berckelman relocated to Berlin and began working on a solo project entitled Feelings. Feelings released their debut album, Be Kind Unwind in October 2013. In 2013, Berckelman assembled Beeson and Williams to join him on tour in Australia under the Feelings moniker. The three playing together for the first time in nearly four years immediately sparked rumours of a Philadelphia Grand Jury reunion, which were confirmed with a midnight performance by the band at the 2013 BIGSOUND Festival in Brisbane. The band then announced a tour for December 2013, incorporating songs for both Feelings and Philadelphia Grand Jury across two sets.

In late 2014, it was revealed the band would be heading to Berlin in 2015 to record new material. The sessions resulted in the band's second studio album, which had the working title of Ulterior Motif. A new single, "Crashing and Burning, Pt. II," was released in August 2015. The album, now titled Summer of Doom, was released in October 2015.

Discography

Albums

Singles

Awards

AIR Awards
The Australian Independent Record Awards (commonly known informally as AIR Awards) is an annual awards night to recognise, promote and celebrate the success of Australia's Independent Music sector.

|-
| AIR Awards of 2009
|"Going to the Casino"
| Best Independent Single/EP
| 
|-
| rowspan="3" | AIR Awards of 2010
| "The Good News"
| Best Independent Single/EP
| 
|-
| rowspan="2" |Philadelphia Grand Jury
| Breakthrough Independent Artist
| 
|-
| Most Popular Independent Artist
| 
|-

J Award
The J Awards are an annual series of Australian music awards that were established by the Australian Broadcasting Corporation's youth-focused radio station Triple J. They commenced in 2005.

|-
| J Awards of 2009
|Hope is for Hopers
| Australian Album of the Year
|

References

External links

Australian indie rock groups
New South Wales musical groups
Musical groups established in 2008
Musical groups disestablished in 2011
Musical groups reestablished in 2013